General John Richmond Webb (26 December 1667 – 5 September 1724), of Biddesden House, Ludgershall, Wiltshire, was a British general and Tory politician who sat in the House of Commons from 1695 to 1724. Politically he was a Hanoverian Tory who supported the Hanoverian Succession rather than the rival Jacobite movement.

Early life
Webb was the son of Colonel Edmund Richmond Webb, a Wiltshire gentleman with a position in the household of Prince George of Denmark and second cousin to another Wiltshire man, Henry St John, who became the Tory leader in Parliament during the reign of Queen Anne. Webb was commissioned as a Cornet of Dragoons in 1687. The following year he served in the Glorious Revolution campaign. While serving under Patrick Sarsfield at the Wincanton Skirmish, he was badly wounded by the Dutch.

On 3 February 1690 Webb married Henrietta Borlase, daughter of William Borlase MP and Joanna Bancks. In 1692 or 1693, possibly using the wealth he acquired by his marriage, he purchased Biddesden House at Ludgershall in Wiltshire, an estate which carried with it the decisive electoral influence over the pocket borough of the same name.

Political and military careers
Webb entered Parliament in 1695 for Ludgershall as a Tory, and became a close political follower of St John. In the same year, he was promoted to Colonel of Princess Anne of Denmark's Regiment of Foot in 1695. In September 1697, he was dangerously injured in a duel. The following year he briefly lost his seat in Parliament, but his defeat at Ludgershall was overturned on petition. He served in Flanders in the campaign of 1702–1703, was a Brigadier at the Battle of Blenheim, and a Major-General at Ramillies and Oudenarde.

In September 1708, commanding the British troops at the Battle of Wijnendale, he succeeded in protecting a convoy from superior French forces and delivering supplies to the besiegers of Lille, which led eventually to the town's capture; but opponents of the army commander, Marlborough, accused him of giving the credit in his initial dispatch to Webb's Whig subordinate, William Cadogan, for political reasons. Webb subsequently received full credit and the thanks of Parliament for the action, and the following year he was promoted to Lieutenant-General. Nevertheless, from this point onwards Webb became the centre of Tory agitation against Marlborough.

In 1709, Webb served at the Battle of Malplaquet, where he was severely wounded; he was awarded a substantial pension and returned to England, seeing no further active service. In 1710 he was appointed Governor of the Isle of Wight, a military post which among other advantages gave substantial influence in choosing the Members of Parliament who sat for the island's three boroughs; he took advantage of this by sitting as MP for Newport, a constituency traditionally represented by at least one distinguished military or naval figure, from 1713 to 1715. Furthermore, in 1712 he was promoted to General, and appointed commander of land forces in Great Britain. However, together with the other Tories, he was dismissed from his offices following the accession of George I. Unable to expect re-election at Newport under the new Governor, his old rival Cadogan, he was forced once more to fall back on the family seat at Ludgershall, which he represented again from 1715 until his death.

Biddesden House 

Webb replaced the manor house at Biddesden with a large house in brick with stone dressings, built in stages around 1711–1712. Biddesden House has a castellated round turret, built to carry a bell brought from Lille. The architect is unknown, perhaps Webb himself. The house stands in parkland and is Grade I listed.

Death and legacy
Webb died on 5 September 1724. He left his estates (which he had enlarged by buying further land in Ludgershall parish) to his second son Borlase Richmond Webb (c. 1696–1738), to the exclusion of his eldest son Edmund. His eldest son by his second wife, also named John Richmond Webb (1721–1766), was a lawyer, and briefly a judge and Member of Parliament.

Webb's brother Thomas Richmond Webb was an ancestor of the novelist William Makepeace Thackeray, and Webb is sympathetically depicted in Thackeray's historical novel The History of Henry Esmond

References

Citations

Bibliography 
 Sir George Clark, The Later Stuarts 1660–1714 (Oxford: Oxford University Press, 1955)
 David Hayton, Eveline Cruickshanks, Stuart Handley, The House of Commons, 1690–1715 (Cambridge: Cambridge University Press, 2002)
 
 Robert Walcott, English Politics in the Early Eighteenth Century (Oxford: Oxford University Press, 1956)
 Concise Dictionary of National Biography (1930)
 thepeerage.com
 regiments.org

External links

|-

1667 births
1724 deaths
British army commanders in the War of the Spanish Succession
English MPs 1695–1698
English MPs 1698–1700
English MPs 1701
English MPs 1701–1702
English MPs 1702–1705
English MPs 1705–1707
Members of Parliament for the Isle of Wight
Tory MPs (pre-1834)
British MPs 1707–1708
British MPs 1708–1710
British MPs 1710–1713
British MPs 1713–1715
British MPs 1715–1722
British MPs 1722–1727
King's Regiment (Liverpool) officers
English duellists